Ediene is a town as well as one of the five clans located in the Abak. Its inhabitants speak the Annang language.

Subdivisions
Eta Ediene
Ibanang Ediene
Ikot Akwa Ebom
Ikot Inyang Ediene
Ikot Obong 
Ikot Oku Ubara and *Awoghonyah village

History

Ediene is a major place and a region of Akwa Ibom State, the area is naturally rich in her resources. UNIUYO's  (Ime Umana Campus) is situated in the area.

References

Towns in Abak